Lightly Latin is Perry Como's 13th RCA Victor 12" long-play album.

The album features lighter Latin-American style arrangements by Nick Perito, his first collaboration with Como. The 1966 release includes five compositions by Brazilian guitarist and bossa Nova specialist Antonio Carlos Jobim, the recent Grammy Award winning hit from the Vincente Minnelli directed motion picture The Sandpiper; The Shadow Of Your Smile, and an early cover version of the Beatles single, “Yesterday.”

Track listing
Side 1
"How Insensitive" (music by Antônio Carlos Jobim and Vinicius De Moraes)
"Stay With Me" (Music by Nick Perito and lyrics by Ray Charles)
"(The) Shadow of Your Smile" (music by Johnny Mandel & words by Paul Francis Webster)
"Meditation" (music by Antonio Carlos Jobim with original lyrics by Newton Mendonça)
"And Roses and Roses" (words and music by Ray Gilbert and Dorival Caymmi)
"Yesterday" (words and music by John Lennon and Paul McCartney)

Side 2
"Coo Coo Roo Coo Coo Paloma" (music by Sosa Tomas Mendez and lyrics by Patricia P. Valando and Ronnie Carson)
"Dindi" (Music by Antônio Carlos Jobim with lyrics by Aloysio De Oliveira)
"Baía" (Music and original lyrics by Ary Evangelista Barroso)
"Once I Loved" (music by Antônio Carlos Jobim with lyrics by Vinicius De Moraes)
"Manhã de Carnaval" (music by Luiz Bonfá and lyrics by Antonio Mariz)
"Quiet Nights of Quiet Stars" (music by Antônio Carlos Jobim, Gene Lees and Buddy Kaye)

References

External links
Perry Como Discography

Perry Como albums
1966 albums
RCA Victor albums